The Japanese Roller Hockey National Championship is the biggest Roller Hockey Clubs Championship in Japan.

Participated teams in the last season

List of winners

Number of Championships by team

External links

Japanese websites
Japan Roller Skating Federation
Tokyo Roller Sports Federation

Japanese teams websites
MJ Club
Triple X RH
Nihon University
Team Attack RHC
Senshu University
Toyo University
Rikkyo University
Aichi Club

International
 Roller Hockey links worldwide
 Mundook-World Roller Hockey
Hardballhock-World Roller Hockey
Inforoller World Roller Hockey 
 World Roller Hockey Blog
rink-hockey-news - World Roller Hockey

Roller hockey in Japan
National championships in Japan
Japan
1960 establishments in Japan
Sports leagues established in 1960